The 1980 LPGA Championship was the 26th LPGA Championship, played June 5–8 at Jack Nicklaus Golf Center at Kings Island in Mason, Ohio, a suburb northeast of Cincinnati.

Sally Little won the first of her two major titles, three strokes ahead of runner-up

Past champions in the field

Made the cut

Source:

Missed the cut

Source:

Final leaderboard
Sunday, June 8, 1980

Source:

References

External links
Golf Observer leaderboard
The Golf Center at Kings Island

Women's PGA Championship
Golf in Ohio
LPGA Championship
LPGA Championship
LPGA Championship
LPGA Championship
Women's sports in Ohio